Christian Harting is a German actor.

Life and career
Christian Harting studied medical science at FU Berlin. After graduation he took acting lessons with Michael Peter and Christine Kostropetsch and since 2010 he has appeared in feature films and TV series in supporting roles as well as leading roles in numerous short films. He is best known for his roles in the two feature films of Hungarian director László Nemes, SS-officer Busch in Son of Saul and Viennese aristocrat Otto von König in Sunset. Son of Saul won the Grand Prix as well as the FIPRESCI Prize at the Cannes Film Festival 2015 and was awarded with a Golden Globe and an Academy Award for Best foreign language film in 2016. Sunset won the FIPRESCI Prize at the Venice Film Festival 2018.

Filmography 
 2010: Dr. Ketel (Feature film directed by Linus de Paoli)
 2012: The Lost (Feature film directed by Reynold Reynolds)
 2012: Shores of Hope (Feature film directed by Toke C. Hebbeln)
 2013: WESPEN - Les guêpes (Short film directed by Hannibal Tourette)
 2013: About:Kate (Arte-TV-series directed by Janna Nandzik)
 2014: Fiddlesticks (Feature film directed by Veit Helmer)
 2015: Son of Saul (Feature film directed by László Nemes)
 2016: Courage (Short film directed by Jean-Luc Julien)
 2017: White City (Short film directed by Dani Gal)
 2018: Datsche (Feature film directed by Lara Hewitt)
 2018: Sunset (Feature film directed by László Nemes)
 2021: A Father's Job (Short film directed by Frank Christian Wagner)

Awards 
In 2017 Harting was nominated as Best Lead Actor in a Foreign Language Film at International Filmmaker Festival of World Cinema BERLIN for the short film Courage.

References

External links 
 
 Talent Agency
 Christian Harting on Schauspielervideos
 Geoffrey Macnab: "Son of Saul: Taboo-busting Holocaust tale", in The Independent, 26 February 2016

1976 births
Living people
21st-century German male actors
German male film actors
Male actors from Berlin